Dhariwal Power Station or CESC Chandrapur Thermal Power Station is a coal-based thermal power plant located at near Tadali town in Chandrapur district in the Indian state of Maharashtra. The power plant is operated by Dhariwal Infrastructure Limited a subsidiary of CESC Limited.

Capacity
It has an installed capacity of 600 MW (2x300 MW).

References

Coal-fired power stations in Maharashtra
Chandrapur district
Year of establishment missing